Mornington may refer to:

Places

Australia

New South Wales 

 Mornington was a name used for Clandulla, in the years from 1900 to 1903.

Queensland
 Mornington, Queensland
 Mornington Island
 Mornington Island Airport
 Shire of Mornington (Queensland)

Tasmania
 Mornington, Tasmania

Victoria
 Mornington, Victoria
 Electoral district of Mornington
 Electoral district of Evelyn and Mornington
 Electoral district of South Bourke, Evelyn and Mornington
 County of Mornington
 Shire of Mornington (Victoria)
 Mornington Peninsula
 Shire of Mornington Peninsula
 Mornington Peninsula National Park
 Mornington Peninsula Freeway
 Mornington Peninsula Nepean Football League
 Mornington railway line, in Melbourne
 Mornington railway station
 Mornington Tourist railway station

Western Australia
 Mornington, Western Australia, the site of former timber saw mills
 Mornington Sanctuary, nature reserve in the Kimberley region
 Mornington Station

Chile
 Mornington Island (Chile)

Ireland
 Mornington House, residence of the Earls of Mornington, Merrion Street, Dublin
 Mornington, County Meath
 Laytown-Bettystown-Mornington

New Zealand
 Mornington, Dunedin, a suburb
 Mornington (New Zealand electorate), a former parliamentary electorate
 Mornington, Wellington, a suburb of Wellington

United Kingdom
 Mornington Crescent, a street in London
 Mornington Crescent tube station, London
 Mornington Meadows, Wales

People
 Earl of Mornington, title in the Peerage of Ireland
 Garret Wesley, 1st Earl of Mornington (1735–1781), Anglo-Irish politician and composer
 Richard Wellesley, 1st Marquess Wellesley (1760–1842), 2nd Earl of Mornington
 William Wellesley-Pole, 3rd Earl of Mornington (1763–1845)
 William Pole-Tylney-Long-Wellesley, 4th Earl of Mornington (1788–1857)
 William Pole-Tylney-Long-Wellesley, 5th Earl of Mornington (1813–1863), British nobleman
 Arthur Wellesley, Earl of Mornington (born 1978), son of Charles Wellesley, 9th Duke of Wellington
 Jemma Wellesley, Countess of Mornington
 Mornington Cannon (1873–1962), known as Morny, English champion jockey

Other uses
 Mornington (ship), a list of ships

See also
 Mornington Crescent (disambiguation)